Brian Sergent (27 November 1926 – 1 August 1998) was a New Zealand cricketer. He played in five first-class matches for Wellington from 1951 to 1953.

See also
 List of Wellington representative cricketers

References

External links
 

1926 births
1998 deaths
New Zealand cricketers
Wellington cricketers
Cricketers from Wellington City